Carlton Elijah Tillery (born August 8, 1957) is an American former boxer in both the cruiserweight and heavyweight divisions, nicknamed "Phoenix Steel".

Amateur career
Born in Albany, NY, Tillery had an amateur record of 45-2.

Professional career
Tillery turned professional in 1980 and was a hard punching journeyman heavyweight during his career.  He is best known for his two fights against Riddick Bowe in 1991.  His first fight with Bowe is known for its bizarre conclusion.  Bowe dominated the first round and dropped Tillery.  After the round ended, Tillery walked toward Bowe and taunted him, and Bowe responded by punching Tillery.  Tillery then landed several kicks on Bowe, and Bowe then unleashed a flurry of punches on Tillery as Tillery lay on the ropes.  Bowe's trainer, Rock Newman, then grabbed Tillery and pulled him over the ropes as Bowe continued to throw punches.  Tillery somersaulted over the ropes and was quickly detained by security.  After order was restored and the fighters returned to the ring, Tillery and Bowe continued a war of words, and there continued to be minor incidents as the ring was cleared.  Tillery was disqualified for the kicks with Bowe getting the win, much to the surprise of the television announcers. 
The fighters rematched two months later, with Bowe dominating and TKO'ing Tillery, his first TKO loss. 
Tillery's next fight was his last, a TKO loss to James Smith two years after his loss to Bowe.

Professional boxing record

|-
|align="center" colspan=8|23 Wins (15 knockouts, 8 decisions), 7 Losses (2 knockouts, 5 decisions) 
|-
| align="center" style="border-style: none none solid solid; background: #e3e3e3"|Result
| align="center" style="border-style: none none solid solid; background: #e3e3e3"|Record
| align="center" style="border-style: none none solid solid; background: #e3e3e3"|Opponent
| align="center" style="border-style: none none solid solid; background: #e3e3e3"|Type
| align="center" style="border-style: none none solid solid; background: #e3e3e3"|Round
| align="center" style="border-style: none none solid solid; background: #e3e3e3"|Date
| align="center" style="border-style: none none solid solid; background: #e3e3e3"|Location
| align="center" style="border-style: none none solid solid; background: #e3e3e3"|Notes
|-align=center
|Loss
|
|align=left| James Smith
|TKO
|6
|14/09/1993
|align=left| Atlantic City, New Jersey, U.S.
|align=left|
|-
|Loss
|
|align=left| Riddick Bowe
|TKO
|4
|13/12/1991
|align=left| Atlantic City, New Jersey, U.S.
|align=left|
|-
|Loss
|
|align=left| Riddick Bowe
|DQ
|1
|29/10/1991
|align=left| Washington, D.C., U.S.
|align=left|
|-
|Loss
|
|align=left| Art Tucker
|UD
|10
|02/11/1990
|align=left| Albany, New York, U.S.
|align=left|
|-
|Win
|
|align=left| William Morris
|MD
|10
|17/08/1990
|align=left| Newark, New Jersey, U.S.
|align=left|
|-
|Win
|
|align=left| Fred Whitaker
|RTD
|4
|08/07/1990
|align=left| Atlantic City, New Jersey, U.S.
|align=left|
|-
|Win
|
|align=left| Mike Dixon
|UD
|6
|08/05/1990
|align=left| Atlantic City, New Jersey, U.S.
|align=left|
|-
|Win
|
|align=left| Dorcey Gaymon
|UD
|8
|15/06/1987
|align=left| Atlantic City, New Jersey, U.S.
|align=left|
|-
|Win
|
|align=left| Mike Cohen
|KO
|3
|23/08/1986
|align=left| Fayetteville, North Carolina, U.S.
|align=left|
|-
|Win
|
|align=left| David Jaco
|KO
|9
|11/07/1986
|align=left| Swan Lake, New York, U.S.
|align=left|
|-
|Win
|
|align=left| Wesley Smith
|TKO
|8
|31/05/1986
|align=left| Albany, New York, U.S.
|align=left|
|-
|Win
|
|align=left| Rodney Frazier
|KO
|4
|05/04/1986
|align=left| Latham, New York, U.S.
|align=left|
|-
|Loss
|
|align=left| Anthony Davis
|UD
|12
|19/09/1984
|align=left| Winchester, Nevada, U.S.
|align=left|
|-
|Win
|
|align=left| William Hosea
|PTS
|10
|09/08/1983
|align=left| Atlantic City, New Jersey, U.S.
|align=left|
|-
|Win
|
|align=left| Louis Alexander
|KO
|1
|15/04/1983
|align=left| New York City, New York, U.S.
|align=left|
|-
|Win
|
|align=left| Charles Vanderhall
|KO
|2
|10/11/1982
|align=left| Latham, New York, U.S.
|align=left|
|-
|Loss
|
|align=left| Alfonzo Ratliff
|UD
|10
|13/03/1982
|align=left| Atlantic City, New Jersey, U.S.
|align=left|
|-
|Win
|
|align=left| Henry Patterson
|TKO
|3
|11/02/1982
|align=left| Philadelphia, Pennsylvania, U.S.
|align=left|
|-
|Loss
|
|align=left| Quadir Muntaqim
|UD
|8
|07/11/1981
|align=left| Atlantic City, New Jersey, U.S.
|align=left|
|-
|Win
|
|align=left| Eddie Smith
|PTS
|8
|24/07/1981
|align=left| New York City, New York, U.S.
|align=left|
|-
|Win
|
|align=left| Kid Samson
|PTS
|8
|25/06/1981
|align=left| Tarrytown, New York, U.S.
|align=left|
|-
|Win
|
|align=left| Fred Brown
|UD
|6
|11/05/1981
|align=left| New York City, New York, U.S.
|align=left|
|-
|Win
|
|align=left| Milton Hopkins
|KO
|1
|18/03/1981
|align=left| White Plains, New York, U.S.
|align=left|
|-
|Win
|
|align=left| Johnny Pitts
|KO
|2
|08/03/1981
|align=left| Atlantic City, New Jersey, U.S.
|align=left|
|-
|Win
|
|align=left| Vincent Johnson
|KO
|1
|28/02/1981
|align=left| Atlantic City, New Jersey, U.S.
|align=left|
|-
|Win
|
|align=left| Calvin Langston
|KO
|1
|18/02/1981
|align=left| White Plains, New York, U.S.
|align=left|
|-
|Win
|
|align=left| Kid Samson
|PTS
|4
|07/02/1981
|align=left| Atlantic City, New Jersey, U.S.
|align=left|
|-
|Win
|
|align=left| Kasim Stephenson
|KO
|1
|07/01/1981
|align=left| New York City, New York, U.S.
|align=left|
|-
|Win
|
|align=left| Austin Johnson
|KO
|1
|12/12/1980
|align=left| New York City, New York, U.S.
|align=left|
|-
|Win
|
|align=left| Gerald Hardy
|KO
|1
|23/10/1980
|align=left| New York City, New York, U.S.
|align=left|
|}

References

External links
 
 

1957 births
African-American boxers
Heavyweight boxers
Living people
Sportspeople from Staten Island
American male boxers
Boxers from New York City
21st-century African-American people
20th-century African-American sportspeople